Apache Woman may refer to:
 Apache Woman (1955 film), an American Western directed by Roger Corman
 Apache Woman (1976 film), an Italian Spaghetti Western film